The Gorno-Badakhshan clashes consisted of fighting between Tajik government forces and an armed group led by Tolib Ayombekov in Tajikistan's semi-autonomous Gorno-Badakhshan province in late July 2012. The Western media described the fighting as the worst in Tajikistan since 2010 or the 1992–1997 civil war.

Background 
On 21 July 2012, Major-General Abdullo Nazarov, head of the Tajik intelligence agency's branch in Gorno-Badakhshan, was fatally stabbed in Ishkashim after being dragged out of his car. The Tajik government accused the forces of Tolib Ayombekov, a former warlord, of responsibility. Ayombekov had been a warlord during the Tajik Civil War between the United Tajik Opposition and the government as led by President Emomali Rakhmon. He was given a government post in a subsequent peace deal. However, Ayombekov and other warlords were gradually driven out as Rakhmon again centralised power. Rakhmon's government had also accused Ayombekov of tobacco smuggling.

Ayombekov denied any responsibility for Nazarov's death, stating that the general had been killed in a simple bar fight after he fell and struck his head on a rock.

Clashes 
After the government announced that "Ayombekov and his accomplices have declined to face justice," phone and internet communications were cut off to the Gorno-Badakhshan capital of Khorog. Tajikistan's most popular news website was also shut down and the personnel of international aid groups were evacuated. Roadblocks were erected on roads leading into the area.

Tajik military forces then moved into the province after which "heavy fighting" ensued on 24 July with militants loyal to Ayombekov in the streets of Khorog. Ayombekov estimated in an interview that 800 Tajik soldiers had been deployed to the area. Residents reported seeing armored vehicles and helicopter gunships.

State-owned television reported that 23 soldiers had been wounded, but no soldiers or civilians had been killed. Initial casualty reports varied. BBC News reported at least 12 soldiers and 30 militants had been killed, but also spoke with a hospital source who reported more than 100 military personnel and 100 civilians dead. The Associated Press cited an unnamed government source as stating that at least twenty soldiers had been killed, while the chief military prosecutor, Khairullo Saidov, suffered a foot injury. Radio Free Europe/Radio Liberty reported that snipers had killed at least six civilians, including children. Al Jazeera reported 12 dead soldiers and 30 dead rebels, as well as more than 20 wounded soldiers.

President Rakhmon ordered a halt to operations the following day, stating that rebel commanders had agreed to make "concessions," and called on all Gorno-Badakhshan militant groups to disarm. Reuters reported that Defence Minister Sherali Khairulloyev had traveled to the area to offer amnesty to all militant leaders who surrendered.

See also 
Andijan massacre

References

Further reading 

2012 in Tajikistan
Gorno-Badakhshan_clashes
Gorno-Badakhshan Autonomous Region
Gorno-Badakhshan_clashes